Jan Šťastný (born 2 June 1970) is a Czech male canoeist who won eight medals at individual senior level at the Wildwater Canoeing World Championships.

References

External links
 

1970 births
Living people
Czech male canoeists
Place of birth missing (living people)